Pacocha (cocha=lake) may refer to
 BAP Pacocha (SS-48)
 Pacocha District, Moquegua Region, Peru
 Battle of Pacocha (1877)

See also 
 Pacucha District, Apurímac Region, Peru